In enzymology, an oxalate CoA-transferase is an enzyme that catalyzes the chemical reaction

succinyl-CoA + oxalate  succinate + oxalyl-CoA

Thus, the two substrates of this enzyme are succinyl-CoA and oxalate, whereas its two products are succinate and oxalyl-CoA.

This enzyme belongs to the family of transferases, specifically the CoA-transferases.  The systematic name of this enzyme class is succinyl-CoA:oxalate CoA-transferase. Other names in common use include succinyl-beta-ketoacyl-CoA transferase, and oxalate coenzyme A-transferase.  This enzyme participates in glyoxylate and dicarboxylate metabolism.

References

 

EC 2.8.3
Enzymes of unknown structure